Daniel Severino (born 11 February 1982 in Sydney, Australia) is an Australian footballer who plays as a central midfielder for Marconi Stallions.

Club career
Daniel plied his trade internationally and locally before joining A-League club Gold Coast United FC on 6 July 2011, on a one-year contract after impressing during a pre-season trial. 
He made his debut for Gold Coast United FC during the Round 1 fixture against Wellington Phoenix during the 2011–12 A-League campaign.

References

1982 births
Living people
Australian soccer players
Australian expatriate sportspeople in England
Expatriate sportspeople in England
Piacenza Calcio 1919 players
Gold Coast United FC players
Umeå FC players
Knattspyrnudeild Keflavík players
Sliema Wanderers F.C. players
A-League Men players
Soccer players from Sydney
Bankstown City FC players
Bonnyrigg White Eagles FC players
National Premier Leagues players
Association football midfielders
Mounties Wanderers FC players
Sportsmen from New South Wales